Wesley Lawrence (born January 20, 1969), better known by his stage name Wesley Pipes, is a retired American pornographic actor.

Career
Pipes entered the adult film industry in 1998. His stage name is a reference to actor Wesley Snipes. In 2009 he was inducted into the Hall of Fame of Urban X Awards. AVN Awards also inducted him into its Hall of Fame in 2015. In January 2015 director Alexander Devoe announced that Pipes had inoperable lung cancer and is having intense treatment.  In May 2020, Pipes announced, on his Instagram account, that his cancer had been in remission as of January 6, 2020.

After his treatment which was certified successful especially with the cancer now in remission, Wes took time to reflect and get back into reckoning this time with Comedy.

On this premise, Wesley released a 14 Tracker album he christened "Still Mr. Ssissippi" a tribute to random comedy and his hood. The Album was produced by TeJohn Anax and SAV DID IT (known to produce tracks for rappers.).

Awards and nominations

References

External links
 
 
 
 

1969 births
African-American pornographic film actors
American male pornographic film actors
Living people
Pornographic film actors from Mississippi
21st-century African-American people
20th-century African-American people